Epacris acuminata , commonly known as claspleaf heath, is a species of flowering plant in the heath family Ericaceae and is endemic to Tasmania. It is a small, spreading shrub with egg-shaped, stem-clasping leaves and tube-shaped flowers with white petals.

Description
The tip of the leaves is sharply-pointed and there are five to seven veins showing on the lower surface. The flowers are arranged singly in leaf axils in dense clusters along the branches.

Taxonomy and naming
Epacris acuminata was first formally described in 1868 by George Bentham in Flora Australiensis. The specific epithet (acuminata) means "tapering to a narrow point".

Distribution and habitat
Claspleaf heath grows in low shrubland on mountain peaks, in heathy woodland, forest and along watercourse. It occurs in the south-east, the midlands and the eastern edge of the Central Plateau in Tasmania.

References

 acuminata
Ericales of Australia
Flora of Tasmania
Plants described in 1868
Taxa named by George Bentham